Khouribga (in  خريبكة ) is a province of Morocco in the region of Béni Mellal-Khénifra. It has a population of 499,144 people, with a majority from Arab roots 

The major cities and towns are: 
 Bejaad
 Boujniba
 Boulanouare
 Hattane
 Khouribga
 Oued Zem

Subdivisions
The province is divided administratively into the following:

References

 
Khouribga Province